Sandra Kay "Sandy" Hess-Gerathy (born 1929) is an American Olympian figure skating coach. From 1988 to 1996 she was the Ice Dance Director of the Broadmoor Skating Club in Colorado Springs, Colorado, a leading center for figure skating.

Notable figure skaters coached by Hess:
 Peter Breen
 Christina Chitwood
 Richard Dalley
 Joseph Druar
 Carol Fox
 Melissa Gregory
 Mark Hanretty
 Rachel Mayer
 Denis Petukhov
 Elizabeth Punsalan
 Renée Roca
 Gorsha Sur
 Jerod Swallow
 Garrett Swasey
 Susan Wynne

Hess is married to Albert Joseph "Bud" Gerathy, Jr, who worked as a dentist in Monument, Colorado until retirement in 2016.

References

1949 births
American figure skating coaches
People from Monument, Colorado
Living people
Female sports coaches
American female ice dancers
21st-century American women